Tumchya Aamchyatali Kusum is an Indian Marathi language drama series. It starred Shivani Baokar and Ajinkya Nanaware in lead roles. It is produced by Ekta Kapoor under the banner of Balaji Telefilms. It premiered from 4 October 2021 on Sony Marathi by replacing Swarajya Janani Jijamata and ended on 26 February 2022. It is an official remake of Hindi TV series Kkusum.

Cast 
 Shivani Baokar as Kusum
 Ajinkya Nanaware as Anuj
 Ketaki Palav as Elisha
 Rahul Mehendale
 Shilpa Navalkar
 Mohiniraj Gatne
 Aarti More
 Vedangi Kulkarni
 Pradnya Jadhav
 Yash Pradhan

Adaptations

References

External links 
 
 Tumchya Aamchyatali Kusum at SonyLIV
 
Marathi-language television shows
2021 Indian television series debuts
2022 Indian television series endings
Sony Marathi original programming